Richard Sidney Slotkin (born November 8, 1942) is a cultural critic and historian. He is the Olin Professor of English and American Studies, Emeritus at Wesleyan University in Middletown, Connecticut, and, since 2010, a member of the American Academy of Arts and Sciences. Slotkin writes novels alongside his historical research, and uses the process of writing the novels to clarify and refine his historical work.

Education and career
Richard Sidney Slotkin was born on November 8, 1942, in Brooklyn, New York. He received a B.A. degree from Brooklyn College in 1963 and a Ph.D. in American Civilization from Brown University in 1967.

He started teaching at Wesleyan University in 1966 and helped establish the school's American studies and film studies program. He remained at Wesleyan until his retirement in 2009.

Awards
Regeneration Through Violence received the Albert J. Beveridge Award of the American Historical Association as the Best Book in American History (1973) and was a Finalist for the National Book Award in 1974. Gunfighter Nation was a National Book Award Finalist in 1993. In 1995, Slotkin received the Mary C. Turpie Award of the American Studies Association for his contributions to teaching and program-building. His novel Abe: A Novel of the Young Lincoln won the 2000 Michael Shaara Award for Excellence in Civil War Fiction.

In 1976, he received an honorary Master of Arts degree in Art Education from Wesleyan University.

Works
Regeneration Through Violence: the Mythology of the American Frontier, 1600–1860 (Wesleyan University Press, 1973)
The Crater: A Novel of the Civil War (Atheneum, 1980)
Fatal Environment: The Myth of the Frontier in the Age of Industrialization, 1800–1890, (Atheneum, 1985)
The Return of Henry Starr (Atheneum, 1988)
Gunfighter Nation: Myth of the Frontier in Twentieth-Century America (Atheneum, 1992)
Abe: A Novel of the Young Lincoln (Henry Holt and Company, 2000)
Lost Battalions: The Great War and the Crisis of American Nationality (Henry Holt and Company, 2005)
No Quarter: The Battle of the Crater, 1864 (Random House, 2009)
The Long Road to Antietam: How the Civil War Became a Revolution (W. W. Norton & Company, 2012)

References

External links

Richard Slotkin Papers. Yale Collection of Western Americana, Beinecke Rare Book and Manuscript Library.

Living people
21st-century American historians
21st-century American male writers
Brown University alumni
Writers from Connecticut
Brooklyn College alumni
Wesleyan University alumni
Wesleyan University faculty
Historians of the American West
1942 births
American male non-fiction writers